Convoy HX 212 was the 212th of the numbered series of World War II HX convoys of merchant ships from HalifaX to Liverpool. The first five escorts had worked together previously, but the last three corvettes were attached to the convoy only for passage to the eastern Atlantic in preparation for assignments on Operation Torch. Summerside was the only escort equipped with modern Type 271 centimeter-wavelength radar.

Background
As western Atlantic coastal convoys brought an end to the second happy time, Admiral Karl Dönitz, the Befehlshaber der U-Boote (BdU) or commander in chief of U-Boats, shifted focus to the mid-Atlantic to avoid aircraft patrols. Although convoy routing was less predictable in the mid-ocean, Dönitz anticipated that the increased numbers of U-boats being produced would be able to effectively search for convoys with the advantage of intelligence gained through B-Dienst decryption of British Naval Cypher Number 3. However, only 20 percent of the 180 trans-Atlantic convoys sailing from the end of July 1942 until the end of April 1943 lost ships to U-boat attack.

26 October
U-436 reported the convoy and shadowed it without being detected by the convoy escort.

27 October
U-436 launched five torpedoes at 2110Z hitting Sourabaya, Gurney Newlin and Frontenac.  Alberni and Summerside dropped back to rescue survivors from the torpedoed ships.

28 October
U-606 torpedoed Kosmos II on the starboard side at 0345Z. Barrwhin dropped back to rescue survivors, and both ships were sunk while the convoy proceeded ahead. A patrolling Consolidated B-24 Liberator from No. 120 Squadron RAF in Iceland prevented five U-boats from reaching attack positions during daylight hours but Bic Island and Pan-New York were torpedoed after sunset.

29 October
Northern routing enabled the convoy to pass through the narrowest portion of the air gap, and continuous daylight air patrols forced the U-boats to lose contact with the convoy. The Naval trawlers Bodo and Molde escorted the convoy through the Western Approaches on 1 November; and the convoy reached Liverpool on 2 November.

Ships in convoy

See also
 Convoy Battles of World War II

Notes

References
 
 
 
 
 

HX212
Naval battles of World War II involving Canada
C